The Czech Pirate Party leadership election of 2020 was held on 11 January 2020. Ivan Bartoš was reelected when he defeated Vojtěch Pikal and Mikuláš Ferjenčík.

Background
Bartoš leads party since 2016. He decided to run for another term. Deputy Speaker of the Chamber of Deputies Vojtěch Pikal and MP Mikuláš Ferjenčík decided to challenge him.

Bartoš was viewed as front-runner as he received nominations from 9 regional organisations while Pikal and Ferjenčík only one nomination each.

Voting
Voting took place on 11 January 2020. Every member of the party was allowed to vote. In the first round voters marked which candidates are acceptable for them. Candidates with more than 50% would advance to the second round. Bartoš and Pikal advanced while Ferjenčík was eliminated. Pikal then withdraw his candidacy so the second round wasn't held and Bartoš was reelected.

References

Czech Pirate Party leadership elections
2020 elections in the Czech Republic
Czech Pirate Party leadership election